The Dume River is a river of northern Democratic Republic of the Congo. It flows through Bondo Territory in Bas-Uele District.
It is a left tributary of the Mbomou River-

References

Rivers of the Democratic Republic of the Congo